This is a list of notable Danish bands and musical groups. For individual singers or musicians, please see list of Danish musicians.

A

 A Friend in London 
 Achillea
 Afenginn
 Alphabeat
 Analogik
 Artillery
 Aqua
 The Asteroids Galaxy Tour

B

 Baal
 Baby Woodrose
 Barcode Brothers
 Beyond Twilight
 Bikstok Røgsystem
 Birmingham 6
 Black City
 Blue Foundation
 The Blue Van
 The Breakers
 Brixx
 Bryan Rice
 BULLDOOZR

C

 C21
 Camille Jones
 Carpark North
 Cartoons
 Choir of Young Believers
 Creamy
 Cut'N'Move

D

 D-A-D
 Daze
 De Nattergale
 Dizzy Mizz Lizzy
 Dominus
 Dúné
 Dreamers' Circus
 De Eneste To

E

 Efterklang
 Evil Masquerade
 EyeQ

F

 The Fashion
 Fate
 Fielfraz
 Figurines
 Filur
 The Floor is Made of Lava
 A Friend in London
 Future 3
 Forever Still

G

 Gangway
 Gasolin'
 Gnags
 Grand Avenue
 Grethe & Jørgen Ingmann

H

 Hatesphere
 Hej Matematik
 Hit'n'Hide
 Hjertestop
 HorrorPops
 Hurdy Gurdy
 Hot Eyes
 Húsakórið

I

 I Got You On Tape
 Iceage
 Infernal
 Illdisposed
 Indigo Sun (Ida Nielsen)
 Inside_The_Whale

J

 Johnny Deluxe
 Johann
 Junior Senior
 Junker

K

 Kashmir
 Kellermensch
 Kliché
 Klutæ
 King Diamond
 The Kissaway Trail

L

 Laban
 Laid Back
 Lars Lilholt Band
 Lazyboy
 Leæther Strip
 Little Trees
 The Loft (Danish band)
 Los Umbrellos
 Lukas Graham
 L.I.G.A

M

 Mabel
 Magtens Korridorer
 Malk de Koijn
 Malurt
 Mames Babegenush
 Manticora
 Medina
 Me & My
 Mercenary
 Mercyful Fate
 Mew
 Michael Learns to Rock
 moi Caprice
 The Minds of 99
 Mnemic
 Mofus

N

 The Naked
 Nekromantix
 Nephew
 Nik og Jay
 New Politics

O

 Oh No Ono
 Olsen Brothers
 Outlandish

P

 Panamah
 Parzival
 Powersolo
 Pretty Maids
 Psyched Up Janis
 The PP Palrollers
 Private
 Pyramaze
 Page Four
 Puls
Phlake

R

 Racetrack Babies
 Raunchy
 The Raveonettes
 Red Warszawa
 Ridin' Thumb
 Rollo & King
 Royal Hunt

S

 S.O.A.P.
 Safri Duo
 The Sandmen
 Saturnus (band)
 Savage Rose
 Saybia
 The Seven Mile Journey
 Shu-Bi-Dua
 Skarn
 Sko/Torp
 Slaraffenland
 The Sonic Dawn
 Sort Sol
 Sorten Muld
 Spleen United
 Steppeulvene
 The Storm
 Substereo
   Supercharger
 Superheroes
 Svartsot
 Swan Lee
 Swing Sisters

T

 Tesco Value
 Tolkien Ensemble
 Toy-Box
 Treefight for Sunlight
 Trust
 Turboweekend
 TV-2
 Two-face

U

 Under Byen

V

VETO
Volbeat
VOLA

W

 When Saints Go Machine
 WhoMadeWho
 The William Blakes

Z

Zididada

Æ

 Æter

See also
 Music of Denmark
 List of Danish musicians

Danish